The 2016 Jinyuan Cup was a professional tennis tournament played on outdoor hard courts. It was the third edition of the tournament and part of the 2016 ITF Women's Circuit, offering a total of $50,000 in prize money. It took place in Zhengzhou, China, on 16–22 May 2016.

Singles main draw entrants

Seeds 

 1 Rankings as of 9 May 2016.

Other entrants 
The following players received wildcards into the singles main draw:
  Kang Jiaqi
  Tang Haochen

The following players received entry from the qualifying draw:
  Feng Shuo
  Guo Shanshan
  Kim Na-ri
  Wang Yan

Champions

Singles

 Anastasia Pivovarova def.  Lu Jingjing, 6–4, 6–4

Doubles

 Xun Fangying /  You Xiaodi def.  Akgul Amanmuradova /  Michaela Hončová, 1–6, 6–2, [10–7]

External links 
 2016 Jinyuan Cup at ITFtennis.com
 Official website 

2016 ITF Women's Circuit
2016 in Chinese tennis
Zhengzhou Open